Fardalen is a valley stretching northwest from the village of Øvre Årdal in Årdal Municipality in Vestland county, Norway. The valley branches off of the main Utladalen valley. The road leads to the Bergsdalen valley in Luster Municipality.

The valley has been inhabited since circa 400-500 AD.  In the winter there are lighted ski tracks in Fardalen.

References

Valleys of Vestland
Årdal

Geography of Norway